Omadino Community is an indigenous Itsekiri urban community in Warri Kingdom. The people of Omadino are the descendants of Nenuwa, the legendary ancestor and founder of the Omadino community who migrated with his followers from Ode in the Ijebu kingdom following their unsuccessful bid for the throne of the Ijebu kingdom. Omadino Community is one of the oldest communities in the Warri Kingdom having existed before the formation of the Warri Kingdom in 1480. Omadino Community is one of the biggest communities in the Warri Kingdom as it falls under Warri South with extensions to Warri North and Warri South-West. It is located in Warri South Local Government Area of present-day Delta State, Nigeria.

It sits in the Obodo/Omadino ward of Warri South and Warri federal constituency.

Geography
Omadino Community shares a boundary with Kantu Community on the left side of Escravos river. The bight of Nana river forms or marks Omadino Community boundary with Ugborodo. Along the Nana creek, Omadino Community shares a boundary with Young Town. Omadino also has a boundary with the Okpe's on solid land.

Families
There are three quarters in Omadino Community which represent three main families. These are Ogbogboro Quarter (Family), Eghorokueri Quarter and Otumara Quarter.

Popular Personalities from Omadino Community
Some popular personalities from Omadino Community include Chief E. E. Sillo, Capt. Godwin Yomere (Rtd) and Emeritus Professor Gabriel Yomere.

Community Resources
Omadino Community is rich in crude oil and is probably one of the richest communities in Nigeria. It plays host to several multinational companies.

Social Infrastructure
There are public and private infrastructures in Omadino Community.

Education
 Jelu Primary school, Omadino 
 Omadino Community Technical College (under construction)
 Eagle Height University (under construction)

Health Facilities
 Omadino Cottage Hospital, Omadino

Roads and Bridges
 Omadino Bridge
 Omadino/Obodo Road

Cultural Festival
Like other Itsekiri communities, Omadino Community is known widely for their very elaborate Nenuwa dance. Every indigene of Omadino community is allowed to participate in this dance. From June 2022 to September 2022, Omadino Community entertained guests of the Atuwatse III with the very popular Nenuwa dance as they were at Aghofen for the 3 months as part of Ghigho Aghofen.

References

See also
Warri

 
Communities of Warri Kingdom
Populated coastal places in Nigeria